Phyllodes verhuelli is a noctuoid moth in the family Erebidae, subfamily Calpinae first described by Samuel Constantinus Snellen van Vollenhoven in 1858. The species can be found in lowland forests in Sundaland, southern Myanmar and the Philippines.

External links

Erebidae
Moths of Borneo
Moths described in 1858
Taxa named by Samuel Constantinus Snellen van Vollenhoven